Mohamed Ali Rashwan (born January 16, 1956) is an Egyptian judoka. At the 1984 Summer Olympics he won the silver medal in the men's Open Class category.

Life
Born in Alexandria in Egypt, His first international participation was in 1972 in Czechoslovakia and Spain.
he retired in 1992 and is now member of the Egyptian Judo Federation and an international judo judge.

Achievements
Winner of fairplay international award in 1984
Silver medallist at the 1985 World Judo Championships in open weight
Silver medallist at the 1987 World Judo Championships in heavy weight

In 1984, he lost the finals to Japan's Yasuhiro Yamashita, who tore a right calf muscle in the preliminaries. Rashwan stated that he did not aim for Yamashita's right leg because he did not regard that as a fair play, and was subsequently given an award from the International Fairplay Committee.

He also won the gold medal in the heavyweight and open class category in the African Championship in 1982 and 1983.

References

External links
https://web.archive.org/web/20080820034155/http://www.sis.gov.eg/VR/figures/english/html/Heif2.htm
Mens Open Class at Sports Reference

1956 births
Living people
Egyptian male judoka
Olympic judoka of Egypt
Judoka at the 1984 Summer Olympics
Judoka at the 1988 Summer Olympics
Olympic silver medalists for Egypt
Olympic medalists in judo
Medalists at the 1984 Summer Olympics
Judo referees
African Games medalists in judo
Competitors at the 1987 All-Africa Games
Competitors at the 1991 All-Africa Games
African Games gold medalists for Egypt
African Games silver medalists for Egypt
20th-century Egyptian people